Scioto Township is one of the twelve townships of Jackson County, Ohio, United States.  As of the 2010 census, 1,921 people lived in the township.

Geography
Located in the western part of the county, it borders the following townships:
Liberty Township: north
Lick Township: northeast corner
Franklin Township: east
Jefferson Township: southeast corner
Hamilton Township: south
Madison Township, Scioto County: southwest
Marion Township, Pike County: west
Beaver Township, Pike County: northwest

No municipalities are located in Scioto Township.

Name and history
Scioto Township was organized in 1816, and named after the Scioto River. It is one of five Scioto Townships statewide.

Government
The township is governed by a three-member board of trustees, who are elected in November of odd-numbered years to a four-year term beginning on the following January 1. Two are elected in the year after the presidential election and one is elected in the year before it. There is also an elected township fiscal officer, who serves a four-year term beginning on April 1 of the year after the election, which is held in November of the year before the presidential election. Vacancies in the fiscal officership or on the board of trustees are filled by the remaining trustees.

References

External links
County website

Townships in Jackson County, Ohio
Townships in Ohio